Salarias alboguttatus, the whitespotted blenny, is a species of combtooth blenny found in coral reefs in the Pacific Ocean and Indian Ocean.  This species reaches a length of  TL.

References

alboguttatus
Taxa named by Rudolf Kner
Fish described in 1867